Rex De Rosselli (May 1, 1878 – July 21, 1941), was an American actor of the silent era, mainly appearing in Westerns. He appeared in more than 150 films between 1911 and 1926. He was born in Kentucky and died in East Saint Louis. He also served as head trainer of the Universal City Zoo from approximately 1915 to 1917. Rex De Rosselli was described as a "silver-haired Beau Brummell" who alternated film work in the winters and circus work in the summers.

Selected filmography
 The Cattle Thief's Escape (1913)
 The Spy (1914)
 Graft (1915)
 Coral (1915)
 The Gift Girl (1917)
 Money Madness (1917)
 The Fighting Gringo (1917)
 The Brazen Beauty (1918)
 The Wine Girl (1918)
 The Lion's Claws (1918)
 Elmo the Mighty (1919)
 Reputation (1921)
 The Man Tamer (1921)
 The Rowdy (1921)
 Lazy Lightning (1926)

See also
 Universal City Zoo

References

External links

1878 births
1941 deaths
American male film actors
American male silent film actors
Male actors from Kentucky
20th-century American male actors
Male Western (genre) film actors
Animal trainers
Zoo directors